Poulterer's Case, 77 Eng. Rep. 813 (K.B. 1611), is a legal case that broadened the definition of conspiracy. It broadened the previous narrow definition to include attempt. The case was decided in the Court of Star Chamber.

References

1611 in law